Duke Mu of Cao (8th Century BCE) was the eleventh ruler of the vassal State of Cao during the Chinese Eastern Zhou Dynasty (770 – 256 BCE) and Spring and Autumn period. Born Jī Wǔ (姬武), he was the son of Cáo Huìbó (曹惠伯). In 760 BCE, Duke Mu of Cao killed his elder brother Cáo Fèibó (曹廢伯/曹废伯) and appointed himself ruler of the State of Cao. He was the first ruler of the State of Cao to receive the posthumous title of "Duke" (公).

References
(Chinese) Liu Jun Ling and Lin Ganhe, Timeline of Chinese Historical Families, Muduo Publishing, Taiwan, 1982. 林干合编，《中国历代各族纪年表》，1982年，台北，木铎出版社

Zhou dynasty nobility
8th-century BC Chinese monarchs